Klubi i Futbollit Elbasani is an Albanian professional football club based in the city of Elbasan, that last competed in the Kategoria e Dytë, the third tier of football in the country.

History
The club was formed in 1913 as Klubi Futbollit Urani Elbasan, the result of the fusion between two clubs, Afërdita Elbasan and Përparimi Elbasan. Urani translates to uranium in Albanian, and the club was named this due to the city's association with the metal. The club changed its name to KS Skampa Elbasan briefly before 1930. They first participated in a nationally recognised competition in the first top flight football league in Albania, the 1930 Kategoria e Parë, where the club finished in 5th place, second from bottom, with a record of 3 wins, 1 draw and 6 losses. The following season they again finished in penultimate place, this time in 7 team league format. In the 1932 champion, they finished bottom of the league, gaining no points after 8 straight losses, which meant that Elbasani were relegated for the first time.

The club changed its name to Bashkimi Elbasanas in 1933, when they were playing in the second division, which they won and earned promotion back to the top flight, winning their first trophy in the process. In their first season back in the Kategoria e Parë, they once again finished second form bottom with 2 wins, 2 draws and 8 losses. No competition was held during 1935 and when the league restarted in 1936 Bashkimi finished once again second from bottom, with 3 wins, 2 draws and 9 losses, but the team below them Ismail Qemali Vlorë played 2 fewer games and finished on the same points tally. The 1937 championship  proved to be more successful as the club finished in 5th place out of 10 teams, with a record of 7 wins, 3 draws and 8 losses.

The league officially restarted following World War II in 1945, where Bashkimi finished 3rd in Group B of the new league format, out of 6 teams. The following season they finished 2nd in Group B, just one point behind runners-up Flamurtari Vlorë. For the 1947 season, the league changed to a single 9 team competition, where Bashkimi finished in 8th place. The following season the league returned to the 2 group format, where the club again finished second by one point to Flamurtari Vlorë. The club changed names again to KS Elbasani in 1949 and KF Puna Elbasan in 1950.

Labinoti Elbasan
Between 1958 and 1991, the club was forcibly named KS Labinoti Elbasan, after a nearby village which had been the center of the first nationwide conference of the Party of Labour of Albania during World War II. In 1984, they won their first and only league title, featuring players like Roland Agalliu, Vladimir Tafani and Muharrem Dosti.

The club's first participation in a European competition came in 1984, where they met Danish side Lyngby Boldklub in the first round of the Champions League qualification stage. The first leg was played at the Ruzhdi Bizhuta Stadium and KF Elbasani were beaten 3–0 at home, and along with another 3–0 loss in Denmark the aggregate result was 6–0 to Lyngby Boldklub.

KF Elbasani
Following the fall of communism, the club changed its name again to KF Elbasani, which they have not changed ever since. During the 2005–06 season, the team of Elbasani dominated the Albanian Superliga and won the second title in their history, finishing the competition with 11 points more than their rivals in SK Tirana.

In 2006–07, 1st qualifying round for the Champions League they were eliminated by FK Ekranas from Lithuania (1–3 aggregate). On 24 December 2006, coach Luan Deliu was fired and replaced by Edmond Gezdari. The team now is seized by the Directorate of Taxes in Elbasan.

Stadium

The club plays its home games at the Elbasan Arena, which was originally built in 1967 and named the Labinot Stadium after the club's name at the time, which was Labinot Elbasan. The stadium was previously called Ruzhdi Bizhuta, after one of the club's most famous players. In January 2014 it was announced that the stadium would take over from the Qemal Stafa Stadium as the home of the Albania national team until Qemal Stafa is reconstructed. Prime minister Edi Rama visited the stadium on 28 January 2014 and he confirmed that work on the stadium would begin shortly, in order for Albania to be able to play their home games in the country as no other stadiums met the minimum requirements for Euro 2016 qualifiers. Works on the stadium began in February, and they were completed in time for Albania's opening qualifying fixture against Denmark in October 2014. The overall reconstruction costs amounted to €5.5 million, which included works being completed on everything from the parking lot to the installation of new floodlights, and the stadium now has an official seated capacity of 12,800.

Honours
Kategoria Superiore
Winners (2): 1983–84, 2005–06
Kategoria e Parë (Tier 2)
Winners (4): 1933, 1958, 2001–02, 2013–14
Runners-up (1): 2009–10
Albanian Cup
Winners (2): 1975, 1992
Albanian Supercup
Winners (1): 1992

European competitions record

 1QR = 1st Qualifying Round
 1R  = 1st Round

Balkans Cup

Current squad

Staff

Historical list of coaches

 Sabri Peqini (1957–1960)
 Frederik Jorgaqi (1983–1985)
 Dashamir Stringa (1990–1995)
 Astrit Sejdini (1996–1999)
 Luan Deliu (2000)
 Petrit Haxhiu (2001–2003)
 Artan Bushati (2004–2005)
 Ilir Daja (2005–2006)
 Luan Deliu (Jul 2006 – 27 Dec 2006)
 Edmond Gëzdari (27 Dec 2006 –7 Apr 2007)
 Ilirjan File (7 Apr 2007 – Jun 2007)
 Krenar Alimehmeti (2007–2008)
 Mirel Josa (24 Aug 2008 – 6 Feb 2009)
 Faruk Sejdini (6 Feb 2009 – 6 Apr 2009)
 Ramadan Shehu (6 Apr 2009 – 22 May 2009)
 Bujar Gogunja (22 May 2009 – Jun 2009)
 Muharrem Dosti (Jul 2009 – 19 Dec 2009)
 Krenar Alimehmeti (19 Dec 2009 – 24 December 2010)
 Esad Karišik (27 December 2010 – 23 February 2011)
 Ilirjan File (28 February 2011 – 9 Sep 2014)
 Edmond Mustafaraj (Sep 2014)
 Muharrem Dosti (Sep 2014 – May 2017)
 Eriol Merxha (Jul 2017 – Sep 2018)
 Elvis Kotorri (Sep 2018 – Mar 2019)
 Marsid Dushku (Mar 2019 – May 2019)
 Shkëlqim Lleshanaku (Aug 2019 –)

Recent seasons

References

External links
KF Elbasani at Soccerway.com
KF Elbasani at UEFA.com
KF Elbasani at EUFO.de
KF Elbasani at Weltfussball.de
KF Elbasani at Football-Lineups.com

 
Association football clubs established in 1923
Elbasani
Sport in Elbasan
1923 establishments in Albania
Kategoria e Dytë clubs